The India women's national cricket team toured England and Ireland in July and August 2002. The tour began with a tri-series between India, England and New Zealand, which was won by New Zealand. India then played against Ireland in three One Day Internationals, with India winning the series 2–0. Finally, India played England in two Test matches and one ODI, with England winning the ODI and the Test series being drawn 0–0.

Tri-Series

Squads

Tour matches

50-over match: England Development Squad v India

50-over match: England Development Squad v India

Group stage

Tour of Ireland

Squads

WODI Series

1st ODI

2nd ODI

3rd ODI

Tour of England

Squads

Tour Matches

50-over match: England Development Squad v India

50-over match: Marylebone Cricket Club v India

50-over match: England Under-21s v India

Test Series

1st Test

2nd Test

Only ODI

See also
 2002 Women's Tri-Series

References

External links
India Women tour of England 2002 from Cricinfo
India Women tour of Ireland 2002 from Cricinfo

India women's national cricket team tours
Women's cricket tours of England
International cricket competitions in 2002
2002 in women's cricket